Magnus Gustafsson was the defending champion, but did not participate.

Andreas Vinciguerra won the title, defeating Magnus Larsson 6–3, 7–6(7–5) in the final.

Seeds
A champion seed is indicated in bold text while text in italics indicates the round in which that seed was eliminated.

  Marat Safin (semifinals)
  Thomas Johansson (first round)
  Magnus Larsson (final)
  Rainer Schüttler (second round)
  Goran Ivanišević (second round)
  Mikael Tillström (first round)
  Roger Federer (semifinals)
  Jonas Björkman (quarterfinals)

Draw

Finals

Top half

Bottom half

References

External links
 Main draw

2000 Copenhagen Open – 1
2000 ATP Tour